Tarimo is a Tanzanian surname. Notable people with the surname include:

 Andrew Tarimo, Tanzanian academic professor and researcher
 Bruno Tarimo (born 1995), Tanzanian professional boxer
 Irene Tarimo (born 1964), Tanzanian environmental scientist and educator
 Priscus Tarimo, Tanzanian businessman and politician